First Baptist Church is a historic African-American Baptist church located in Norfolk, Virginia. It was designed by architect R. H. Hunt and dedicated in 1906.  It is a Romanesque Revival-style church with a richly ornamented facade of rough-faced, pink granite ashlar and limestone trim. It features a tall, eight-level corner tower with a multiplicity of window types and a shorter flanking tower at the opposite corner. Construction began in 1904.

It was listed on the National Register of Historic Places in 1983.

References

External links

First Baptist Church website

African-American history of Virginia
20th-century Baptist churches in the United States
Baptist churches in Virginia
Churches on the National Register of Historic Places in Virginia
Romanesque Revival church buildings in Virginia
Churches completed in 1906
Churches in Norfolk, Virginia
National Register of Historic Places in Norfolk, Virginia
1906 establishments in Virginia